George Pelham may refer to:

George Pelham (bishop) (1766–1827), English bishop
George F. Pelham (1857–1937), American architect
George Pelham (1873–1939), Titanic survivor